Kalyan taluka is a taluka of the Thane district of Maharashtra in Konkan division. The capital is the city of Kalyan.

The taluka is cubic in form, and in its western part a rich open plain. In the south and east, ranges of hills running parallel with the boundary line throw out spurs into the heart of the plain. The transport of produce is facilitated by the tidal creek of the Ulhas river and by the Great Indian Peninsula Railway. There are disagreeable east winds in April and May; but although fever is prevalent in the cold season, the climate is on the whole temperate and healthy.

History
According to the 1901 census (during British rule) the population in 1901 was 77,087, compared with 80,171 in 1891. The density was 279 persons per square mile, or rather more than the District average. In the recent 2011 Census, population of Kalyan Tehsil was found to be 1276614 people.
 
Land revenue and cesses in 1903-4 amounted to 2-2 lakhs.

Thane district
Until 31 July 2014, Thane was the country's most populous district of India with a population of over 1.2 crore. On 1 August 2014,  the talukas of Mokhada, Jawahar, Talasari, Vikramgadh, Wada, Dahanu, Palghar and Vasai were separated from the erstwhile Thane district to form a new district Palghar. The talukas  Thane, Bhiwandi, Kalyan, Ulhasnagar, Ambernath, Murbad and Shahapur were retained in Thane district.

References

Attribution

Talukas in Thane district
Talukas in Maharashtra